A lacrosse stick or crosse is used to play the sport of lacrosse. Players use the lacrosse stick to handle the ball and to strike or "check" opposing players' sticks, causing them to drop the ball. The head of a lacrosse stick is roughly triangular in shape and is strung with loose netting that allows the ball to be caught, carried (known as "cradling"), passed, or shot.

Traditional stick

A wood lacrosse stick is usually crafted from hickory trees.  The lacrosse stick is given its shape through steam bending.  Holes are drilled in the top portion of the head and the sidewall (i.e., the side of the stick head), permitting weaving of  string, which is then hardened by dipping them in resin.  Leather "runners" are strung from the top of the "head" to the "throat" of the stick.  Then nylon string is woven in to create the pocket.

The wooden lacrosse stick dates back to the creation of the sport and is still made by craftsmen around the world. Though modern lacrosse sticks made of plastic have become the overwhelming choice for contemporary lacrosse players, traditional wooden lacrosse sticks are still commonly used by box lacrosse goaltenders, senior and masters players, and by women's field lacrosse players. Wooden sticks are still legal under Canadian Lacrosse Association and NCAA rules but are subject to the same size regulations as modern lacrosse sticks. The only exception to this is the Western Lacrosse Association, which prohibited the use of wooden sticks by non-goaltenders some years ago. The last WLA player to use one was A.J. Smith of the Coquitlam Adanacs, c. 2003–04, who had been grandfathered.

Men's modern stick

Head

In 1970, the first patent (US Patent #3,507,495) for a synthetic lacrosse stick was issued to STX. A modern lacrosse stick consists of a plastic molded head attached to a metal or composite shaft. The head is strung with nylon or leather strings to form a pocket. The dimensions of the stick (length, width, sidewall height, and depth of the pocket) are governed by league rules, such as NCAA rules for collegiate players or FIL rules for international players.

The head of the goalie's stick is much larger and must be between 10 and 12 inches wide under NCAA rules or up to 15 inches (38 cm) wide under FIL rules. The sidewalls of the head may not be more than two inches (5 cm) tall.

Pocket
The pocket of the head is where the ball is carried and caught. It consists of interwoven string attached to the head. Traditional stringing with leather strings interwoven with nylon has declined in popularity in favor of synthetic mesh stringing. Mesh is typically made of nylon and comes in a variety of diamond configurations, which can affect the pocket's throwing and retention characteristics.

The typical mesh pocket uses four main nylon strings to affix the mesh piece to the head: a topstring, two sidewalls, and a bottom string. The topstring is often made of a slightly thicker string, in order to resist the abrasive forces that come from scooping the ball up. The sidewalls are used to affix individual mesh diamonds to the sidewall holes on the sidewall of the head. The sidewalls have the most effect on the pocket's performance, as they dictate the placement of the pocket in the head, the tightness of the channel of the pocket, and even the pocket depth. The bottom string is used to fine-tune the pocket depth, and serves to keep the ball from slipping through the bottom of the pocket.

In addition to the four strings used to affix the mesh piece, shooting strings are woven through the diamonds of the mesh in order to help fine-tune the pocket's characteristics.  They can either be made of typical nylon string, or a hockey style lace. Shooting strings are often used in straight, U, or V shapes.  They serve to increase the pocket's hold on the ball, as well as fine-tune the way the stick throws. They can act to change the tension of various portions of the pocket, helping to create a "ramp" for the ball to roll along as it exits the pocket.

As of the 2013 season, the NCAA has passed a rule stating that shooting strings are limited to an area within a 4-inch (10 cm) arc drawn from the top of the plastic of the scoop. This essentially eliminates U- or V-shaped shooting strings, as they almost always cross below the 4-inch (10 cm) line. The pocket depth is governed by rule as well. When the ball is placed in the deepest point, the top of the ball must not be below the bottom of the sidewall.

Shaft
Modern handles, more commonly referred to as "shafts," are made of hollow metal. They are usually octagonal, instead of round, in order to provide a better grip. Most are made of aluminum, titanium, scandium, or alloy, but some shafts are still made from other materials, including wood, plastic, or fiberglass. The open end of the hollow shaft must be covered with tape or a plug (commonly referred to as the "butt" or "butt end" of the stick), usually made of rubber.  The head of the stick is usually attached to the shaft with a screw to keep it in place.

Stick length is governed by NCAA regulations, which require that men's sticks (including the head) be from 40 to 42 inches (102 to 107 cm) long for offensive players, 52 to 72 inches (132 to 183 cm) long for defensemen, and 40 to 72 inches (102 to 183 cm) long for goalies. Offensive players usually prefer their sticks to be the minimum length (40 inches or 102 cm) in order to give them the advantage of having a shorter stick to protect from defensive checks.  Conversely, defensive players usually prefer their sticks to be the maximum length (72 inches or 183 cm) to permit them the greatest range in covering their offensive player.

In 2016, a rules clarification was made by the NCAA Men's Lacrosse Rules Committee. Questions have arisen regarding the alteration of the shaft circumference. The circumference of the shaft cannot exceed 3 1/2" (8.9 cm). To be clear, added tape to the shaft must not make the shaft exceed this circumference measurement.

Women's modern stick
In women's lacrosse, the stick dimensions are similar except the pocket depth is much shallower. NCAA rules dictate that the head of a woman's stick may be from seven to nine inches wide, and must be strung traditionally, with a pocket formed by a grid of leather strings.  Nylon mesh stringing, long permitted in men's sticks, was recently allowed in women's sticks by the end of 2018. The goalkeeper's stick head may be up to 12 inches (30.5 cm) wide and is allowed to be strung with nylon mesh. The legal depth of a women's stick pocket is determined by the following test: the top of the lacrosse ball, when placed in the pocket, must remain above the top edge of the sidewall. Women's sticks can be 35.5 to 43.25 inches (90 to 110 cm) long.

References

External links
 Men's lacrosse rules
 Women's lacrosse rules
 Boys' lacrosse rules
 Girls' lacrosse rules
 Historical Lacrosse Stick and Equipment Database
 Defensive Lacrosse Shaft

Stick
Sports equipment